Sau Mau Ping Estate is one of the earliest public housing estates in Kwun Tong District, New Kowloon, Hong Kong. It has 18 blocks, providing a total of 12,310 rental flats. A total of 38,833 residents currently live in the 11,912 households on the Sau Mau Ping Estate.

Hiu Lai Court is a Home Ownership Scheme court beneath Sau Mau Ping Estate. It has a total of eight blocks built in 1997.

History

After the World War II, the population of Hong Kong grew rapidly. Therefore, the Hong Kong government decided to build a resettlement area in Sau Mau Ping, which was then known as the Sau Mau Ping Resettlement Area. This resettlement area later became the Sau Mau Ping Estate as it is today.

The development of Sau Mau Ping Resettlement Area (or the later Sau Mau Ping Estate) can be divided into six phases:

Phase 1
The first phase of the estate's development starts at lower Sau Mau Ping, and was completed during 1964–1966. It consisted of the building of Blocks 1–17, which are all 7-storey L-shaped resettlement buildings. The Blocks 1–17 was collectively called Sau Mau Ping (IV) Estate.

All buildings in phase 1 were demolished in 1992. They were later reconstructed and became the current Hiu Lai Court.

Phase 2
The second phase of development was the construction of Blocks 32–41 at regions currently known as central Sau Mau Ping. Blocks 34–41 were completed during 1966–1967, and are then collectively called Sau Mau Ping (III) Estate. Blocks 32–33 were completed later in 1969.

Blocks 32–33 were demolished in 1997, and are reconstructed to become the current Sau Mau Ping Shopping Centre. Blocks 34–36 were also demolished in the same year, and the site was used for the reconstruction of 4 Harmony-style public rental housing building, currently known as Sau Nga House, Sau Yee House, Sau Hong House and Sau Lok House. Blocks 37–41 were demolished in 2001.

Phase 3
The third phase consisted of only two blocks, Blocks 26–27. They have a special structure resembles that of Block 66 in Tsz Wan Shan Resettlement Area, in which they are connected with each other to form a long building.

However, the two blocks were demolished as early as in 1985 because of safety concerns.

Phase 4
Phase 4 of the development involves the construction of Blocks 31, which then combines with the existing Blocks 32 and 33 to form a complex. The construction of the resettlement complex completed during 1968–1970. Later on, the ground floor of the complex became a marketplace. The complex was demolished in 1997.

Phase 5
The fifth phase of the development involved the construction of Blocks 19–20 and 28–30, which were completed in 1970. After the completion of Phase 5, Blocks 19–31 was collectively named as Sau Mau Ping (I) Estate.

Block 18 was planned to be built in Phase 5 development of Sau Mau Ping, at the site of the current Sau Ming House. The construction work has never been carried out due to practical difficulties.

Blocks 28–30 were demolished in 1997, and Blocks 19–20 were demolished in 2001.

Phase 6
The sixth phase consisted of Blocks 21–25, completed in 1971, and Blocks 42–45, completed in 1973. All these blocks are collectively named as Sau Mau Ping (II) Estate.

Blocks 42–45 were demolished in 1996 due to structural problems. The site was rebuilt into three buildings of the current Sau Mau Ping Estate, namely Sau Ching House, Sau Yue House and Sau Fai House.

Phases 7 & 8
By the end of 2000, the Hong Kong Housing Authority has decided to demolish and rebuild at the site of the old Sau Mau Ping Estate, which were condemned in 2003. The redevelopment project was finally completed in July 2009, and the new public rental housing estate was named Sau Mau Ping Estate, the same name as the original one. They were occupied in 3rd quarter of 2009.

The Sau Mau Ping Gangs Corpse Burning Case (秀茂坪童黨燒屍案)
On 14 May 1997, the chilling torture and murder of 16-year-old Luk Chi-wai took place and shocked the city at the time. Luk was tortured and murdered by his fellow gang members for telling a fellow bullied gang member to report his bullying to the police. As a result, his action was considered betrayal by his fellow gang and he was beaten with fists, kicked and attacked with blunt weapons until death, then his body was burned in a trash bag. As a result, those convicted (all juveniles) served life sentences.

Residential buildings

Sau Mau Ping Estate
{According to 2016 Population By-census, Sau Mau Ping (North) houses 20,616, Sau Mau Ping (South) houses 15,415 and Sau Mau Ping (Centre) 16,979 respectively. Altogether the population amounts to 53,010.}

Sau Mau Ping (South) Estate

Hiu Lai Court

Public facilities

Sau Mau Ping Shopping Centre
Sau Mau Ping Shopping Centre (秀茂坪商場) was established in 2002, located near Sau Mau Ping Estate, with approximately 26401.6 square metres.
A fresh market is located at ground floor had been renovated in September 2015.

Year of completion: 2002
Total lettable area: 14700 sq. metres

Covid pandemic
Sau Yee House was sealed off on 25 February, 2022.  Sau Ming House of the estate were placed under lockdown on 26 February.  Sau Fu House was sealed on 27 February.

See also
Sau Mau Ping

References

External links

Hong Kong Housing Authority – Sau Mau Ping Estate

Public housing estates in Hong Kong
Kwun Tong District
Sau Mau Ping